Carina Edlinger (born 13 August 1998) is an Austrian visually impaired Paralympic cross-country skier.

Career
She made her Paralympic debut during the 2018 Winter Paralympics just at the age of 19 and claimed her first Paralympic medal (bronze) with the assistance of her elder brother, Julian Edlinger who served as the sighted guide for Carina. Carina Edlinger clinched a bronze medal in the women's 7.5km classical cross-country skiing event at the 2018 Winter Paralympics. She competed at the 2022 Winter Paralympics and won a gold medal in the 1.5 kilometre sprint and a bronze medal in the 10 kilometre free event.

References

External links 
 

1998 births
Living people
Austrian female cross-country skiers
Cross-country skiers at the 2018 Winter Paralympics
Cross-country skiers at the 2022 Winter Paralympics
Paralympic cross-country skiers of Austria
Paralympic gold medalists for Austria
Paralympic bronze medalists for Austria
Medalists at the 2018 Winter Paralympics
Medalists at the 2022 Winter Paralympics
Austrian blind people
Visually impaired category Paralympic competitors
People from Bad Ischl
Sportspeople from Upper Austria
Austrian emigrants to Sweden
Paralympic medalists in cross-country skiing